Eric Curran (born June 8, 1975) is an American race car driver who competes in the WeatherTech SportsCar Championship for Action Express Racing with co-driver Felipe Nasr. Curran and previous co-driver Dane Cameron won their first race together, the Chevrolet SportsCar Classic, in the Whelen Engineering Team Fox Corvette DP on May 30, 2015.  He has 3 wins and 4 poles in the Rolex Sports Car Series.  Curran joined Whelen motorsports in 2007. Curran won the WeatherTech SportsCar Championship in 2018.

Motorsports career results

NASCAR

Nationwide Series
(key) (Bold – Pole position awarded by qualifying time. Italics – Pole position earned by points standings or practice time. * – Most laps led.)

SCCA National Championship Runoffs

24 Hours of Daytona results

WeatherTech SportsCar Championship results
(key)(Races in bold indicate pole position, Results are overall/class)

1 – Relegated to last in class for violation of minimum drive time requirements.

References

External links
 
 http://ericcurran.com/
 http://axracing.com/

Living people
1975 births
WeatherTech SportsCar Championship drivers
Rolex Sports Car Series drivers
24 Hours of Daytona drivers
12 Hours of Sebring drivers
NASCAR drivers
Racing drivers from Florida
SCCA National Championship Runoffs winners
Action Express Racing drivers